Realists is a defunct conservative party based in the Czech Republic. It was founded by Petr Robejšek in November 2016. Other members include Pavel Kohout, Antonín Fryč and Jiří Horecký. Robejšek stated that the party aims to succeed in the 2017 legislative election. The party said that it will defend Czech national interests and govern according to the Pareto principle.

History
The party was established on 24 November 2016. Petr Robejšek took the title of "mentor", because the new leader was to be elected in 2016. The Realists criticised ANO 2011, which they called a "left leaning" party. The Realists were founded in response to Brexit and the victory of Donald Trump in the 2016 Presidential election in the United States. The party is ideologically close to the Civic Democratic Party and Dawn - National Coalition. The Realists registered as an official party in December 2016 as Party of Regions but changed its name to the Realists soon afterwards.

The Realists launched their campaign for the 2017 elections on 14 February 2017. Robejšek said that he hoped to win 20% of votes in the election.

Martin Lank, who was elected as a member of Dawn of Direct Democracy, joined the Realists on 25 May 2017. Robejšek stated that the party was prepared to accept other MPs if they decided to join the party and shared its views. Another MP from Dawn, Jana Hnyková, joined the Realists on 5 September 2017.

On 21 August 2017, the Realists announced Jiří Hynek as their presidential candidate in the 2018 election.

The Realists received 0.7% of votes in the 2017 legislative election, failing to reach the 5% electoral threshold. Party leaders refused to describe the result as a defeat, and Jiří Hynek stated that the Realists should prepare for the next election.

The party announced on 16 July 2019 that it would vote on whether to dissolve itself due to electoral defeats and passive regional organisations. The party announced on 22 July 2019 that its members had voted to dissolve the party.

Election results

Chamber of Deputies

Presidential

See also
:Category:Realists (political party) politicians

References

External links
  

¨

 
National conservative parties in the Czech Republic
Liberal conservative parties in the Czech Republic
Defunct political parties in the Czech Republic
Eurosceptic parties in the Czech Republic
Political parties established in 2016
Right-wing parties in the Czech Republic
Populism in the Czech Republic
2016 establishments in the Czech Republic
Political parties disestablished in 2019